Shyam Narayan Singh was an Indian freedom fighter and politician who served as Member of Central Legislative Assembly from East Bihar. In 24 January 2012, Government of India honored him by issuing commemorative stamp on him.

Personal life 
He was born in 1901 in Nalanda district.

References 

1901 births
Year of death missing
Members of the Central Legislative Assembly of India